Filippo D'Andrea (born 25 September 1998) is an Italian professional footballer who plays as a forward for  club Cerignola.

Club career
Born in Rome, D'Andrea started his senior career with Serie D club Terme Fiuggi. He left the club at the end of 2019–20 season, and signed for Salernitana.

On 2 October 2020, he was loaned to Foggia.

On 18 August 2021, he joined Seregno on loan. On 21 January 2022, he moved on a new loan to Teramo.

On 24 August 2022, D'Andrea signed with Cerignola.

References

External links
 

1998 births
Living people
Footballers from Rome
Italian footballers
Association football forwards
Serie C players
Serie D players
A.S.D. Atletico Terme Fiuggi players
U.S. Salernitana 1919 players
Calcio Foggia 1920 players
U.S. 1913 Seregno Calcio players
S.S. Teramo Calcio players
S.S.D. Audace Cerignola players